Diphenidol is a muscarinic antagonist employed as an antiemetic and as an antivertigo agent. It is not marketed in the United States or Canada.

Although the mechanism of action of diphenidol on the vestibular system has not yet been elucidated, it exerts an anticholinergic effect due to interactions with mACh receptors, particularly M1, M2, M3 and M4. Hence, its actions may take place at the vestibular nuclei, where a significant excitatory input is mediated by ACh receptors, and also at the vestibular periphery where mACh receptors are expressed at efferent synapses. A series of selective mACh-receptor antagonists based on the diphenidol molecule has been synthesized, but they have not yet been the subject of clinical trials.

References 

Antiemetics